Patrick Galvin MM (1882 – 17 October 1918), sometimes known as Paddy Galvin, was an English professional footballer who played as a centre half in the Football League for Glossop. He was the first ever Rochdale player to be sent off.

Personal life 
Galvin was born in Glossop to Irish parents and worked as labourer in a paper works. He served with the Royal Dublin Fusiliers at Gallipoli, Salonika, Egypt and on the Western Front during the First World War. While serving as an acting lance corporal, Galvin was killed during the Battle of Cambrai in France on 17 October 1918 and his Military Medal was gazetted posthumously on 13 June 1919. He was buried in Highland Cemetery, Le Cateau-Cambrésis.

Career statistics

Honours 
Rochdale

 Lancashire Combination Second Division promotion: 1909–10
 Lancashire Junior Cup: 1909–10

References

English footballers
English Football League players
Glossop North End A.F.C. players
1882 births
1918 deaths
People from Glossop
Footballers from Derbyshire
British military personnel killed in World War I
British Army personnel of World War I
Royal Dublin Fusiliers soldiers
Association football wing halves
Rochdale A.F.C. players
Eccles United F.C. players
Recipients of the Military Medal
English people of Irish descent